The Chief of the Defence Staff in the Gambia is the head of the Gambia Armed Forces, and is appointed by the President.

Role 
The Chief of the Defence Staff is responsible for the operational control and administration of the Gambia Armed Forces, according to Section 188 (1) of the Constitution of the Gambia. The Chief of the Defence Staff has a permanent place on the National Security Council, authorised by Section 78 of the constitution, and on the Armed Forces Council, authorised by Section 189 of the constitution. In order to appoint or dismiss a Chief of the Defence Staff, the President must first consult with the National Security Council.

List of Chiefs of the Defence Staff

List of Deputy Chiefs of the Defence Staff 
 Masaneh Kinteh, ?–2009
 Yankuba Drammeh, 2009
 Ousman Badjie, 2009
 Yankuba Drammeh, 2009–2010
 Major General Ousman Badjie, 2010–2012
 Vacant, 2012–2015
 Major General Yankuba Drammeh, 2015–present

References 

Military of the Gambia
 
Military history of the Gambia
Gambia